The SS Mexico Victory was the 7th Victory ship built during World War II. She was launched by the California Shipbuilding Company on March 27, 1944 and completed on May 19, 1944. She was built in 114 days under the Emergency Shipbuilding program. The ship’s United States Maritime Commission designation was VC2-S-AP3, hull number 7 (V-7).  SS Mexico Victory served in the Pacific Ocean during World War II. The 10,500-ton Victory ships were designed to replace the earlier Liberty Ships. Liberty ships were designed to be used just for World War II. Victory ships were designed to last longer and serve the US Navy after the war. The Victory ship differed from a Liberty ship in that they were: faster, longer and wider, taller, a thinner stack set farther toward the superstructure and had a long raised forecastle.
SS Mexico Victory was the 7th of a long line of Victory ships to leave the Calship building. The launching of The SS Mexico Victory splashed into the water of Wilmington, Los Angeles.

World War II
SS Mexico Victory served in the Atlantic Ocean in World War II as a troopship. She severed as a troop ship take troop to Europe.  SS Mexico Victory and 96 other Victory ships were converted to troop ships to bring the US soldiers home as part of Operation Magic Carpet.
She depart February 27, 1945 from New York Port of Embarkation and arrived March 11, 1945
at Liverpool, England.
On January 3, 1946 she arrived at Newport News, Va. with 1,514 troops. On December 6, 1945 she arrived in New York bring troops home.

She was laid up for a short time in 1947 in the National Defense Reserve Fleet at Suisun Bay, till she was put back in service for the Korean War.

Korean War
The Mexico Victory served in the Korean War from 1950 until 1953 helping American forces engaged against Communist aggression in South Korea. About 75 percent of the personnel taken to Korea for the Korean War came by the merchant marine ships. SS Mexico Victory transported goods, mail, food and other supplies. About 90 percent of the cargo was moved by merchant marine ships to the war zone.

Post war
In 1967 she was sold to Gdynia-America Shipping Lines in Gdańsk, Poland and renamed SS Kilinski. In 1971 she was sold to Poul Christensen in Denmark and renamed SS Lin. In 1973 she was scrapped in Kaohsiung, Taiwan.

See also
List of Victory ships
 Liberty ship
 Type C1 ship
 Type C2 ship
 Type C3 ship

References

Sources
Sawyer, L.A. and W.H. Mitchell. Victory ships and tankers: The history of the ‘Victory’ type cargo ships and of the tankers built in the United States of America during World War II, Cornell Maritime Press, 1974, 0-87033-182-5.
United States Maritime Commission: 
Victory Cargo Ships 

Victory ships
Ships built in Los Angeles
United States Merchant Marine
1944 ships
World War II merchant ships of the United States
Troop ships of the United States